Park Hill is a neighborhood in Denver, Colorado, U.S. Located in the northeastern quadrant of the city, it is bordered by Colorado Boulevard on the west, East Colfax Avenue on the south, Quebec Street on the east, and East 52nd Avenue on the north. The entire Park Hill neighborhood is located in the area known as East Denver. It is further divided by the City and County of Denver into three administrative neighborhoods, South Park Hill, North Park Hill, and Northeast Park Hill.

History
This development was bordered by present-day Montview Boulevard on the south, Colorado Boulevard on the west, East 26th Avenue on the north, and Dahlia Street on the east, placing it in what is now the western portion of South Park Hill.

The first homes in Park Hill were offered for sale in 1900. As the neighborhood grew, settlers from many nations, including England, Denmark, Germany, the Netherlands, and Italy, moved in, as did African Americans. After World War II, residential development increased in the northern part of the neighborhood.

Dahlia Square
In the early 1950s, the Dahlia Square Shopping Center was built in Northeast Park Hill atop a landfill. Located between Dahlia Street and Elm Street and between East 33rd Avenue and East 35th Avenue, it was the commercial heart of the neighborhood during its time, and at its peak featured a number of businesses including a grocery store. As time passed, it fell into disrepair and was considered a nuisance by residents.

Starting in the 1990s, under efforts by then-mayor Wellington Webb, several redevelopment plans were considered, but none was successful until April 2005, after Webb left office. In that month, the site was purchased by Parkhill Community Inc., a subsidiary of Brownfield Partners, LLC, which had been chosen by the Denver Urban Renewal Authority (DURA) to clean up the site and prepare it for redevelopment. In late 2005, DURA announced it would work exclusively with Alliance Development Partners, Inc., to redevelop the site when remediation was complete. Alliance was formed by Webb and partners.

Demolition of the structures on the site, including removal of asbestos, was completed by December 2005, and remediation of the landfill began in February 2006.

Demographics
Data from the U.S. census indicate that in the year 2000, there were a total of 26,422 residents in 10,221 households in the three administrative neighborhoods comprising Park Hill. Income increased from north to south, and the number of minority residents increased from south to north. The racial makeup of Park Hill, as a whole, is 39.76 percent white (27.06 percent white alone-non Hispanic), 51.48 percent African American, 2.87 percent  Asian, 1.21 percent Native American. Hispanic or Latino of any race is 17.38 percent of the population.

South Park Hill
In 2010, South Park Hill had 8,590 residents in 3,449 households. The racial makeup of South Park Hill is 77.42 percent non-Latino white, 7.97 percent African American, 2.41 percent Asian, 0.48 percent Native American. Hispanic or Latino  is 8.87 percent of the population. in 2000, Its median income was $88,479, well above the city's overall median income of $55,128.62.

North Park Hill
In 2000, North Park Hill had 10,057 residents in 3,944 households. North Park Hill's racial breakdown is 29.82 percent white (18.45 percent white alone-non Hispanic), 59.01 percent African American, 2.14 percent Asian, 0.96 percent Native American. Hispanic or Latino of any race is 19.44 percent of the population. Its median income was $58,392.34, slightly higher than the city's overall median income of $55,128.62.

Northeast Park Hill
In 2000, Northeast Park Hill had 7,824 residents in 2,633 households. The racial makeup of the neighborhood is 7.54 percent white (2.68 percent white alone-non Hispanic), 70.50 percent African American, 0.41 percent Asian, 0.24 percent Native American. Hispanic or Latino of any race is 23.81 percent of the population. Its median income was $37,468.06, below the city's overall median income of $55,128.62.

In all of North Park Hill (the north and northeastern neighborhoods), there were 17,881 residents in 6,577 households. The racial makeup of the north Park Hill and northeast Park Hill neighborhoods together is 14.52 percent white (7.33 percent white alone-non Hispanic), 68.75 percent African American, 0.76 percent Asian, 0.24 percent Native American. Hispanic or Latino of any race is 22.92 percent of the population.

A fire on May 18, 2008, destroyed most of Holly Square, perhaps connected to the death of the Denver Crips founder, Michael Asberry, who was murdered in Aurora, CO.,

The average price per square foot for a home in Park Hill in November 2017 was $272 psf.

Greater Park Hill Community organization
The Greater Park Hill Community (GPHC) is a non-profit neighborhood organization formed in 1961. The GPHC, managed and staffed largely by volunteers: serves as a liaison between local residents and businesses and the City and County of Denver; publishes a monthly newspaper, the Greater Park Hill News, which is distributed free to residents of Park Hill's administrative neighborhoods and nearby businesses; operates a Youth Jobs Program to help young people ages 12–15 find summer jobs; and sponsors an annual home tour in the fall, The Greater Park Hill Home Tour, which has been held for the past 30 years.

Famous people from Park Hill
Detroit Pistons basketball player and 2004 NBA Finals MVP Award winner Chauncey Billups
Former USC and NFL running back LenDale White
Former University of Arizona and former Denver Broncos running back Mike Bell was raised in Park Hill.
Jazz singer Dianne Reeves is a current resident
Former governor of Colorado John Hickenlooper moved to Park Hill in 2007
ESPN The Magazine and former Sports Illustrated columnist Rick Reilly was born in Park Hill
Actress and Golden Globe winner Pam Grier lived in Park Hill and attended East High School
Victoria "Vikki" Buckley Secretary of State of Colorado, raised in Park Hill and attended East High School

References

 Neighborhood Link information on Greater Park Hill Community

Neighborhoods in Denver
Historic districts in Colorado
Streetcar suburbs